Collix angustipennis is a moth in the family Geometridae. It was described by Warren in 1906. It is found in New Guinea.

References

angustipennis
Moths described in 1906
Taxa named by William Warren (entomologist)